Garmin BaseCamp is a map viewing / GIS software package primarily intended for use with Garmin GPS navigation devices.

Features 
 View map and satellite imagery and transfer it to the GPS device.
 Plan trips by entering routes and waypoints and transferring them to the device.
 Geotag photos and export them to e.g. Picasa.

References

GIS software